Masaharu Gotōda (後藤田正晴, Gotoda Masaharu, 9 August 1914 – 19 September 2005) was a Japanese politician of the Liberal Democratic Party, a member of the House of Representatives in the diet, Minister of Justice, and Chief Cabinet Secretary. A native of Yoshinogawa, Tokushima and graduate of Tokyo University.

Gotōda served as Commissioner General of the National Police Agency from 1969 to 1972, Chief Cabinet Secretary, Director of General Affairs Agency from 1982 to 1987 (under Prime Minister Yasuhiro Nakasone), and he was Vice Prime Minister and Minister of Justice from 1992 to 1993 (under Prime Minister Kiichi Miyazawa).  As a politician, Gotōda was called the "Japanese Andropov".

Gotōda retired in 1996, when he was 82 years old.

References

1914 births
2005 deaths
Liberal Democratic Party (Japan) politicians
Members of the House of Representatives (Japan)
Deputy Prime Ministers of Japan
Ministers of Justice of Japan
People from Tokushima Prefecture
University of Tokyo alumni